Events from the year 1936 in Taiwan, Empire of Japan.

Incumbents

Central government of Japan
 Prime Minister: Keisuke Okada, Kōki Hirota

Taiwan
 Governor-General – Nakagawa Kenzō, Seizō Kobayashi

Events

November
 26 November – The completion of Zhongshan Hall in Taihoku Prefecture.

Births
 14 January – Su Nan-cheng, Mayor of Kaohsiung (1985–1990)
 26 June - Lee Ming-liang, Minister of Department of Health (2000–2002)
 28 September – Kuo Ting-tsai, Member of Legislative Yuan (1993–2002)
 24 October – Lin Ming-chang, chemist
 8 November – Huang Kun-huei, Chairman of Taiwan Solidarity Union (2007–2016)

References

 
1930s in Taiwan
Years of the 20th century in Taiwan